Minchinbury Sandstone is a component of the Wianammatta Group of sedimentary rocks in the Sydney Basin of eastern Australia.

Formation
Formed in the middle Triassic period, this sandstone was structured by marine deposition as a set of sandy barrier islands at a coastal shoreline.

Location
The type locality of the formation is near the Great Western Highway in the suburb of Minchinbury in western Sydney. It is most often seen in the western parts of the city.  Outcroppings are weak and not easily found, but it may be seen in places like road cuttings in localities from Epping, Grose Vale-Kurrajong, Kellyville, Rogans Hill, Bankstown, Pendle Hill, Bonnyrigg, Menangle, Duck River, Brownlow Hill and other sites.

Description
Thickness is between 1.5 and 6 metres, usually less than 3 metres. It comprises up to 70% quartz with calcite and volcanic lithic fragments. There is less feldspar and more calcite than the adjacent Bringelly Shale. Related to Greywacke, it comprises fine to medium-grained lithic sandstone. The Bringelly Shale lies above the Minchinbury Sandstone.  Fossils are rare in this stratum, though plant fragments have been recorded.

See also
Sydney Basin, Hawkesbury sandstone, Bringelly Shale, Ashfield Shale, Wianamatta shale, Mittagong formation and Narrabeen Group.

References

Geology of New South Wales